Everybody Dance Now is the third album from Crazy Frog, released on 25 August 2009. "Daddy DJ", "Cha Cha Slide", and "Safety Dance" were the three singles released from the album. In France, they respectively peaked at #4 and #18 on the SNEP chart, and the album reached #23.

Track listing
Based on Discogs:
"Join The Frog"   – 0:58
"Cha Cha Slide"   – 3:04
"Everyone"   – 3:15
"Daddy DJ" (Crazy Frog Video Mix)  – 2:54
"Friends" (Ween Meets The Crazy Frog Remix)  – 4:09
"Maya Hi, Maya Hu"   – 2:58
"Just Can't Get Enough"   – 3:00
"Jump"   – 2:57
"Solo Frog"   – 2:11
"No Limit"   – 3:44
"Play The Game"   – 2:54
"Push It"   – 3:06
"Gonna Make You Sweat (Everybody Dance Now)"   – 3:11
"Safety Dance"   – 2:56
"Come On"   – 2:50
"Let's Go Crazy"   – 3:29
"Bump The Beat"   – 2:57
"I Wanna Rock the Place"   – 3:15
"Last Christmas"   – 3:11

References 

2009 albums
Crazy Frog albums
Ministry of Sound albums